Lorenzo Musetti defeated Carlos Alcaraz in the final, 6–4, 6–7(6–8), 6–4 to win the men's singles tennis title at the 2022 Hamburg European Open. It was his maiden ATP Tour title, and he saved two match points en route, in his first round match against Dušan Lajović.

Pablo Carreño Busta was the defending champion, but lost in the second round to Alex Molčan.

Seeds

Draw

Finals

Top half

Bottom half

Qualifying

Seeds

Qualifiers

Lucky loser

Qualifying draw

First qualifier

Second qualifier

Third qualifier

Fourth qualifier

References

External links
Main draw
Qualifying draw

2022 ATP Tour
Men's singles